McMillin is a surname. Notable people with the surname include:

Benton McMillin (1845–1943), Governor of Tennessee
Bo McMillin (1895–1952), American football coach
Challace McMillin (1942–2020), American football coach at James Madison University
Corky McMillin (1929–2005), American racer
David McMillin (born 1984), American singer
George McMillin (1889–1983), 38th and final Naval Governor of Guam
James McMillin (1914–2005), American Olympic rower
John Ernest McMillin (1884–1949), member of Canadian House of Commons
John S. McMillin (1855–1936), American lawyer and businessman
Judson McMillin (born 1977), member of the Indiana House of Representatives

See also
Crocker-McMillin Mansion-Immaculate Conception Seminary, National Register of Historic Places site in New Jersey
McMillin Bridge, bridge in Washington state
McMillin Observatory, observatory in Ohio
Johnson–McMillin syndrome, syndrome causing hearing loss

Anglicised Irish-language surnames